Statistics of Guam League for the 2006 season.

Spring League

Group stage

Semifinals
Guam Shipyard 2-1 Orange Crushers
Quality Distributors 4-2 Dodge Rams

Third-place match
Orange Crushers 8-2 Dodge Rams

Final
Guam Shipyard 6-1 Quality Distributors

Fall League

References
Guam 2006 (RSSSF)

Guam Soccer League seasons
Guam
Guam
football